Metarctia cinnamomea is a moth of the  subfamily Arctiinae. It was described by Wallengren in 1860. It is found in South Africa.

References

 Natural History Museum Lepidoptera generic names catalog

Endemic moths of South Africa
Metarctia
Moths described in 1860